Yoon Joo (born December 4, 1989) is a South Korean actress.

Biography 
Yoon was a 3rd Dan taekwondo player until middle school, when she ended her sport training due to an injury. She then attended  to learn acting. In the same year, Yoon played the main role in the movie , after she was introduced to the audition by a person who worked with her on the play Catch him. However, the film was not released for two years after filming, during which Yoon struggled to make money while work on various part-time jobs such as serving in a coffee shop to move out of her parents' house who were against her career choice. In November 2012, Bad Blood was released and her performance received positive reviews. The Seoul Shinmun evaluated her performance, saying, "Yoon's strong acting is impressive as she plays a shocking and complex character in her debut which attracted our attention." Fashion magazine Arena Homme + named Yoon as the 2013 promising rookie actress.

Filmography

Television series

Film

Theater

Music video appearances 

Awards

References 

South Korean film actresses
South Korean television actresses
1989 births
Living people
21st-century South Korean actresses